James Grady (born April 30, 1949) is an American writer and investigative journalist known for his thriller novels on espionage, intrigue, and police procedurals.

Early life
Grady was born on April 30, 1949, in Shelby, Montana. He graduated from Shelby High School in 1967 and the University of Montana School of Journalism in 1974.

Career
During college he worked for U.S. Senator Lee Metcalf of Montana. In 1971 Grady worked as a staff aide for the Montana Constitutional Convention, which adopted a renewed state Constitution in 1972. From 1974 to 1978, during the post-Watergate era, he worked with pioneering muckraking investigative journalist Jack Anderson.

Grady is the author of the 1974 espionage thriller novel Six Days of the Condor, which was famously adapted to film as Three Days of the Condor (1975), starring Robert Redford and directed by Sydney Pollack. In addition to about a dozen novels and many short stories, Grady has written for film and television.

Grady has contributed to Slate, The Washington Post, Washingtonian, American Film, The New Republic, Sport, Parade, and the Journal of Asian Martial Arts.

Grady is a member of the Writers Guild of America, East.

Personal life
Grady married Bonnie Goldstein in 1985. He is the stepfather of Rachel Grady, director of the documentary Jesus Camp.

Works

Novels
 Six Days of the Condor (1974)
 Shadow of the Condor (1976)
 The Great Pebble Affair
 Catch the Wind
 Razor Game
 Just a Shot Away
 Steeltown
 Runner in the Street
 Hard Bargains
 River of Darkness (reissued as The Nature of the Game)
 Thunder
 White Flame
 City of Shadows
 Mad Dogs
 Last Days of the Condor (2015)
 This Train

Short stories
 "The Dark Sacred Night"
 "Broken Heroes"
 "The Bottom Line"
 "condor.net"
 "The Championship Of Nowhere"
 "Kiss The Sky"
 "The Devil’s Playground"
 "OMJAGOD"
 "The Arranger"
 "The Train"
 "Next Day of the Condor" (2015)

References

External links
 Official site
 

American thriller writers
American male screenwriters
American television writers
American investigative journalists
University of Montana alumni
1949 births
Living people
American male novelists
American male television writers
People from Shelby, Montana
American male non-fiction writers
Screenwriters from Montana